Walter Tyrrell III, the “Red Knight of Normandie” (1065 – some time after 1100), was an Anglo-Norman nobleman. He is infamous for his involvement in the death of King William II of England, also known as William Rufus.

Life
Walter Tirel was born in Tonbridge, Kent, the son of Norman Walter Tirel, and was lord of Poix-de-Picardie in France, and of Langham, Essex (as appears in the Domesday Survey). By marriage, he became linked to the English royal family, having wed Adeliza, the daughter of royal kinsman, Richard Fitz Gilbert. He died some time after 1100. The grandson of Walter and Adeliza, Hugh Tyrrel, took part in the Norman Conquest of Ireland and became the first baron of Castleknock.

Death of William II

On 2 August 1100, King William II organized a hunting trip in the New Forest. William was presented with six arrows, on the eve of the hunt; taking four for himself, he handed the other two to Tirel, saying, "Bon archer, bonnes fleches" ("[To the] good archer, the good arrows.")

On the subsequent hunt, the party spread out as they chased their prey, and William, in the company of Tirel, became separated from the others. It was the last time that William was seen alive.

In their search for prey, according to chroniclers, Tirel let loose a wild shot at a passing stag. However, instead of striking the stag as intended, the arrow pierced William in the chest, puncturing his lungs. Stricken with panic, Walter leapt upon his horse and fled to France. A version of this tale is given by William of Malmesbury in his Chronicle of the Kings of the English (c. 1128), in which Tirel is referred to as "Walter Thurold":

The day before the king died he dreamt that he went to hell and the Devil said to him "I can't wait for tomorrow because we can finally meet in person!". He suddenly awoke. He commanded a light to be brought, and forbade his attendants to leave him. The next day he went into the forest... He was attended by a few persons... Walter Thurold remained with him, while the others, were on the chase. The sun was now declining, when the king, drawing his bow and letting fly an arrow, slightly wounded a stag which passed before him... The stag was still running... The king, followed it a long time with his eyes, holding up his hand to keep off the power of the sun's rays. At this instant Walter decided to kill another stag. Oh, gracious God! the arrow pierced the king's breast.

On receiving the wound the king uttered not a word; but breaking off the shaft of the arrow where it projected from his body... This accelerated his death. Walter immediately ran up, but as he found him senseless, he leapt upon his horse, and escaped with the utmost speed. Indeed there were none to pursue him: some helped his flight; others felt sorry for him.

The king's body was placed on a cart and conveyed to the cathedral at Winchester... blood dripped from the body all the way. Here he was buried within the tower. The next year, the tower fell down. William Rufus died in 1100... aged forty years. He was a man much pitied by the clergy... he had a soul which they could not save... He was loved by his soldiers but hated by the people because he caused them to be plundered.

Murder or accident?

To some chroniclers, such an "Act of God" was a just end for a wicked king. However, over the centuries, the obvious suggestion that one of William's many enemies may have had a hand in this extraordinary event has been repeatedly made. Even chroniclers of the time point out that Walter was renowned as a keen bowman, and unlikely to loose such an impetuous shot. William's brother Henry, who was among the hunting party that day, benefited directly from William's death, as he was shortly after crowned king. Henry, who once threw a man off a tower to his death, was not normally troubled by moral scruples: on the other hand it has been argued that fratricide was then regarded as a particularly horrible crime, and even the suspicion of it would have done great harm to the new King's reputation. It may be significant, as Henry's modern biographer remarks, that nobody at the time seems to have had any such suspicions: contemporaries took it for granted that the death was an accident, such accidents being common enough.

Abbot Suger, another chronicler, was Thurold's friend and sheltered him in his French exile. He said later:

It was laid to the charge of a certain noble, Walter Thurold, that he had shot the king with an arrow; but I have often heard him, when he had nothing to fear nor to hope, solemnly swear that on the day in question he was not in the part of the forest where the king was hunting, nor ever saw him in the forest at all.

Rufus Stone

The point where it is claimed that Rufus fell is marked with the Rufus Stone near Minstead in the New Forest. Tirel's name is written as "Sir Walter Tyrrell" on the stone. The "Sir Walter Tyrrell" pub is nearby.

Notes

References
 Hollister, C. Warren. "The Strange Death of William Rufus." Speculum, 48.4 (1973): 637–653.
 Warren, W. L. "The Death of William Rufus." History Today, 9 (1959)

External links
J.H. Round's Medieval England: Walter Tirel and his wife

1065 births
12th-century deaths
11th-century Normans
11th-century English nobility
12th-century Normans
12th-century English nobility
Anglo-Normans
Norman warriors
People from Tonbridge
William II of England